Tetu is a sub-county in Nyeri County, Kenya. It is located west of adjacent Nyeri town, the county capital. Tetu Constituency is also the name of a local electoral constituency. Tetu sub-county has a total population of 80,100 and a population density 378 of per km² .
Tetu is predominantly a rural division without any major central township. Some of the shopping centers with large markets include Muthinga, Gichira, Ithekahuno and Wamagana.

Tetu sub-county is served mainly by Nyeri town due to proximity. Most residents conduct business in Nyeri town as they farm and live in Tetu sub-county.

Two of the most famous Kenyans come from Tetu: liberation leader Dedan Kimathi and Nobel peace prize laureate Wangari Maathai.

Populated places in Central Province (Kenya)
Nyeri County